Sandia Speedway (formerly known as Sandia Motorsport Park and NAPA Speedway) is a multiple use racing facility located in Albuquerque, New Mexico, USA. The complex provides two short ovals, a multiple configuration road course, Kart racing ovals, a 3/8 Mile Dirt Oval, and a motocross area.

They ran two NASCAR K&N Pro Series West races between 2012 and 2013. And also hosted one NASCAR Southwest Series event in 2000.

Facilities

Short Tracks
Both the 1/2 mile oval, and a smaller 1/4 mile oval are integrated with the main road course.

Karting Ovals/Circuits
There are small karting ovals located in the complex.

Motocross
Areas in the complex are dedicated to Motocross tracks.

Roadcourses
Several possible configurations exist of the main racetrack, two of which are considered standard for roadracing use. The main racetrack is 1.7 miles in length, with 13 turns in total. All turns and straights on the course are flat. Some sanctioning bodies, such as the SCCA, use the shorter, 1.1 mile configuration for safety purposes. Any configuration may be used for drift racing.

External links
NAPA Speedway Homepage
Sandia Speedway archive at Racing-Reference 

Motorsport venues in New Mexico
NASCAR tracks
Sports venues in Albuquerque, New Mexico